Thiophosphoryl iodide is an inorganic compound with the formula .

Preparation 
Thiophosphoryl iodide can be prepared by reacting phosphorus triiodide with sulfur in carbon disulfide at 10–15 °C in the dark for several days.

Attempts to synthesise  by the reaction of lithium iodide with thiophosphoryl bromide lead to the mixed thiophosphoryl halides  and  instead.

References 

Thiophosphoryl compounds
Thiohalides
Inorganic phosphorus compounds